is a Japanese voice actor and singer. He has previously worked with Haikyō. He is honorary president of and affiliated with Atomic Monkey and the chairman of theater company HeroHero Q. He is a special lecturer at Japan Newart College.

Career
Seki landed his first role in 1993 anime Mobile Suit Victory Gundam as Tomache Massarik. Some of his most notable roles include Shinichi Chiaki from Nodame Cantabile, Gilgamesh from Fate/stay night, Rob Lucci from One Piece, Gundam characters Domon Kasshu and Yzak Joule (from G Gundam, Gundam Seed Gundam Seed Destiny, respectively), Kyo Sohma from Fruits Basket, Whisper from Yo-kai Watch, Kanji Tatsumi from Persona 4, Shinya Kogami from Psycho-Pass, Ichiro Miyata from Hajime no Ippo, Haru Glory from Rave Master, Toya Kinomoto (Sakura Kinomoto's older brother) from Cardcaptor Sakura, Van Fanel from The Vision of Escaflowne, Suneo Honekawa in Doraemon, Chichiri from Fushigi Yuugi, Ken Hidaka from Weiss Kreuz, alongside Hiro Yūki, Takehito Koyasu, and Shinichiro Miki. Koyasu and Miki, along with Seki, have also voiced in Initial D as Keisuke Takahashi, Gravitation, and Nobuo Terashima in Nana, as well. He has also voiced the roles of Ryūki Shi in Saiunkoku Monogatari, in Lucky Star as the recurring guest character, Meito Anizawa & Shōji Tōkairin along with Sakiko Tamagawa, Akiko Hiramatsu & Sakakibara Yoshiko in  You're Under Arrest Season 1, The Movie & Fast & Furious Season 2.

On November 20, 2017, Seki apologized on the online radio program Unizon for an incident that took place on November 19, 2017 during an event for the online radio program A&G All Star 2017, where he had instructed Yusuke Tonozaki, a newbie voice actor from his agency, to ask voice actress Rina Hidaka to have sex with him as a joke.

Filmography

Television animation

Original net animation (ONA)

Original video animation (OVA)

Film animation

Drama CD
 Card Captor Sakura Original Drama Album 1 (1998) – Tōya Kinomoto
 Abunai series 1: Abunai Shuugaku Ryokou - Izumi Sudou
 Abunai series 4: Abunai Campus Love - Wataru Sawada
 Anatolia Story - Kikkuri
 Angel Sanctuary - Sandalphon
 Beauty Pop - Narumi Shogo
 Buso Renkin - Moon Face
 D.N.Angel Wink - Satoshi Hiwatari
 Dragon Knights - Rath Eryuser
 Everyday Everynight - Enohara Midato
 FAKE ~A Change of Heart~ - Dee Laytner
 Fate/Zero - Gilgamesh
 Fruits Basket - Kyo Sohma
 Gaki/Kodomo no Ryoubun - Kayano Hiromi
 Gaki no Ryoubun series 1: Kayanoke no Okite - Hiromi Kayano
 Gaki no Ryoubun series 2: Hasumi Koukou - Hiromi Kayano
 Gaki no Ryoubun series 3: Saikyou Hiiruzu - Hiromi Kayano
 Gaki no Ryoubun series 4: Uwasa no Shinzui - Hiromi Kayano
 Gaki no Ryoubun series 5: Akuun no Jouken - Hiromi Kayano
 Gaki no Ryoubun series 6: Manatsu no Zankyou - Hiromi Kayano
 Gaki no Ryoubun series 7: Monster Panic - Hiromi Kayano
 Gaki no Ryoubun series 8: Bunkiten Vol.1 Hottan - Hiromi Kayano
 Gaki no Ryoubun series 9: Bunkiten Vol.2 Haran - Hiromi Kayano
 Genso Suikoden II Drama CD - Luca Blight
 Haou Airen - Hakuron
 Juvenile Orion - Kusakabe Kaname
 Kimi ga Suki Nanosa - Tsugumi Kanou
 Love Celeb - Ginzo Fujiwara, Hakuron
 Mekakushi no Kuni - Naitō Arō
 Mossore
 Niji no Irie ~Trouble Studio~ - Kiwa Irie
 Rolex ni Kuchizukewo - Kazuya Yuu
 Rurouni Kenshin - Sagara Sanosuke
 Saiunkoku Monogatari - Ryūki Shi
 Sakurazawa vs Hakuhou series 1: Shokuinshitsu de Naisho no Romance - Katsumi Hirose
 Samurai Deeper Kyo - Shinrei
 Tokyo Junk  1 & 2 - Yuuichi Sakura
 Yatteraneeze! - Takashi Masaki

Radio
 Fate/Zero Radio material - Gilgamesh
 Saiunkoku Monogatari - Ryūki Shi

Video games
 2nd Super Robot Wars Z Saisei-Hen - Gou Another Century's Episode 2 - Domon Kasshu
 Apocripha/0 - Sapphirus Hawthorne
 Assassin's Creed II (Japanese version) - Ezio Auditore da Firenze
 Assassin's Creed: Brotherhood (Japanese version) - Ezio Auditore da Firenze
 Atelier Lise ~Alchemist of Ordre~ - Client Marif
 BlazBlue: Cross Tag Battle - Kanji Tatsumi (DLC)
 Bleach Wii: Hakujin Kirameku Rondo - Arturo Plateado
 Burning Rangers - Lead Phoenix
 Daraku Tenshi - The Fallen Angels - Haiji Mibu
 Dark Chronicle - Osmond
 Evil Zone (Eretzvaju) - Danzaiver - Sho Mikagami
 Fate/stay night - Gilgamesh
 Fate/tiger colosseum - Gilgamesh
 Fate/Unlimited Codes - Gilgamesh
 Fate/Extra CCC - Gilgamesh
 Fate/Grand Order - Gilgamesh, Wolfgang Amadeus Mozart
 Fate/Extella: The Umbral Star - Gilgamesh
 Fate/Extella Link - Gilgamesh
 God Eater 3 - Hugo Pennywort
 Gradius The Slot - Ace
 Granblue Fantasy - Gawain, Nicholas-[Original JP name]-(Shiro), Mepple (Mepple and Mipple), Suneo Honekawa
 Guilty Gear Xrd - Lucifero, Answer
 Guilty Gear -STRIVE- - Lucifero
 Hakuouki Reimeiroku - Ryunosuke Ibuki
 Harukanaru Toki no Naka de 1 - Morimura Tenma
 Harukanaru Toki no Naka de 2 - Taira no Katsuzane
 Harukanaru Toki no Naka de 3 - Minamoto no "Kurou" Yoshitsune
 Harukanaru Toki no Naka de 4 - Sazaki
 Harukanaru Toki no Naka de 5 - SeiryuuHigurashi No Naku Koro Ni Kizuna - Riku Furude
 Initial D Arcade Stage series - Keisuke Takahashi
 Invisible Sign series - Aizawa Shun
 J-Stars Victory VS - Koro-Sensei
 JoJo's Bizarre Adventure: All Star Battle R - Enrico Pucci
 Katekyo Hitman Reborn DS: Fate of Heat II - Bligganteth
 Kamen Rider: Battride War Genesis - Great Leader of Shocker
 Legend of Dragoon - Dart Feld
 Lego Batman 3: Beyond Gotham (Japanese version) - Plastic Man
 Lunar: Silver Star Story - Kyle
 Marvel vs. Capcom 3: Fate of Two Worlds - Viewtiful Joe
 Ultimate Marvel vs. Capcom 3 - Viewtiful Joe
 Master Detective Archives: Rain Code - Zilch Alexander
 Mobile Suit Gundam: Gundam vs. Gundam - Domon Kasshu
 Mobile Suit Gundam: Gundam vs. Gundam Next Plus - Domon Kasshu, Yzak Joule
 Mobile Suit Gundam Side Story - Summona Fulis
 Namco × Capcom - Black Bravoman, Stahn Aileron
 Neon Genesis Evangelion: Girlfriend of Steel - Touji Suzuhara
 Neon Genesis Evangelion: Girlfriend of Steel 2nd - Touji Suzuhara
 Octopath Traveler - Alfyn
 Odin Sphere - Onyx
 Paper Mario: The Origami King - King Olly
 Persona 4 - Kanji Tatsumi
 Persona 4 Golden - Kanji Tatsumi
 Persona 4 Arena - Kanji Tatsumi
 Persona 4 Arena Ultimax - Kanji Tatsumi
 Persona Q: Shadow of the Labyrinth - Kanji Tatsumi
 Phantasy Star Universe - Ethan Waber
 Private eye dol - Koji Sakaki
 SD Gundam G Generation - Summona Fulis, Domon Kasshu
 SD Gundam G Generation Spirits - Summona Fulis, Tomache Massarik
 SD Gundam G Generation World - Domon Kasshu, Yzak Joule, Tomache Massarik
 Sengoku Basara 3 - Ishida Mitsunari
 Sengoku Basara 4 - Ishida Mitsunari
 Skies of Arcadia - Vyse
 Skylanders series - (Japanese versions) Terrafin, Slam Bam
 Sly Cooper series (Japanese versions) - Sly Cooper
 Sonic & All-Stars Racing Transformed - Vyse
 Sonic Unleashed (Sonic the Werehog)
 Soulcalibur V - Ezio Auditore da Firenze
 Super Robot Wars Original Generation Saga Endless Frontier EXCEED - Aledy Nashe
 Super Robot Wars Z - Toshiya Dantou
 Steins;Gate - Hashida Itaru
 Street Fighter X Tekken - Yoshimitsu, Bryan Fury
 Xenosaga - Virgil
 Tales of Destiny - Stan Aileron
 Tales of Destiny 2 - Stan Aileron
 Tales of the World: Narikiri Dungeon 2 - Stan Aileron
 Tales of the World: Narikiri Dungeon 3 - Stan Aileron
 Tales of the World: Radiant Mythology - Stan Aileron
 Tales of the World: Radiant Mythology 2 - Stan Aileron
 Tales of the World: Radiant Mythology 3 - Stan Aileron
 Tales of VS - Stan Aileron
 Tengai Makyō: Daiyon no Mokushiroku - Raijin
 Tekken 4 - Yoshimitsu
 Tekken 5 - Yoshimitsu
 Tekken 5: Dark Resurrection - Yoshimitsu
 Tekken 6 - Yoshimitsu
 Tekken Tag Tournament 2 - Yoshimitsu
 Tekken 3D: Prime Edition - Yoshimitsu
 Tekken 7 - Yoshimitsu
 The Fallen Angels - Haiji Mibu
 The King of Fighters All Star - Dellons
 The Vision of Escaflowne - Van Fanel
 Tokyo Afterschool Summoners - Leib
 Viewtiful Joe: Red Hot Rumble - Joe
 Warriors Orochi 4 Ultimate - Hades
 Xenogears - Bart Fatima
 Zoids Vs. III - Arrow
 Valkyrie Connect - Thor
Cytus 2 - Xenon

Tokusatsu

Puppetry
Sherlock Holmes (2014) - Langdale Pike
Thunderbolt Fantasy (2016–present) - Betsu Ten Gai / Mie Tian Hai

Live-action films
Laughing Under the Clouds (2018)
Patalliro! (2019)
Maku wo Orosuna! (2023)

Live-action television
Tokusatsu GaGaGa (2019), General Genka (voice)
Tower of Justice (2021), Takafumi Makizono
Voice II (2021)
The 13 Lords of the Shogun (2022), Tsuchimikado Michichika

Dubbing

Live-action
Cha Tae-hyun
 My Sassy Girl – Gyeon-woo
 First Love Rally – Son Tae-il
 My Girl and I – Kim Su-ho
 My New Sassy Girl – Gyun-woo
 Along with the Gods: The Two Worlds – Kim Ja-hong
James McAvoy
 The Chronicles of Narnia: The Lion, the Witch and the Wardrobe – Mr. Tumnus the Faun
 Atonement – Robbie Turner
 His Dark Materials – Lord Asriel Belacqua
Oscar Isaac
 Spider-Man: Into the Spider-Verse – Miguel O'Hara / Spider-Man 2099
 Moon Knight - Marc Spector / Moon Knight, Steven Grant / Mr. Knight, and Jake Lockley
 Ant-Man and the Wasp – Sonny Burch (Walton Goggins)
 Black Widow – Rick Mason (O-T Fagbenle)
 Bullet Train – Lemon (Brian Tyree Henry)
 Fatal Attraction (2021 Wowow edition) – Dan Gallagher (Michael Douglas) (additional recording)
 Flags of Our Fathers – Rene Gagnon (Jesse Bradford)
 Frankenstein's Army – Vassili (Andrei Zayats)
 From Dusk till Dawn: The Series – Seth Gecko (D. J. Cotrona)
 Get Smart (2011 TV Asahi edition) – Bruce (Masi Oka)
 High School Musical series – Chad Danforth (Corbin Bleu)
 Jexi – Kai (Michael Peña)
 A Life Less Ordinary – Robert Lewis (Ewan McGregor)
 Lords of Dogtown – Jay (Emile Hirsch)
 Lost & Found – Dylan Ramsey (David Spade)
 Lyle, Lyle, Crocodile – Mr. Primm (Scoot McNairy)
 Mars – Dr. Jay Johar (Akbar Kurtha)
 Powder – Jeremy "Powder" Reed (Sean Patrick Flanery)
 Quiz – Chris Tarrant (Michael Sheen)
 Rise of the Planet of the Apes – Dr. William "Will" Rodman (James Franco)
 Roman Holiday (2022 NTV edition) – Irving Radovich (Eddie Albert)
 That Thing You Do! – Jimmy Mattingly (Johnathon Schaech)
 The Smurfs 2 – Brainy Smurf (Fred Armisen)
 This Is the End – Jay Baruchel
 Transformers: Revenge of the Fallen – Skids (Tom Kenny)
 The Wedding Ringer – Doug Harris (Josh Gad)

Animation
 Encanto – Agustín Madrigal
 Ron's Gone Wrong – Ron
 The Super Mario Bros. Movie – Toad
 Trolls World Tour – King Trollex

TV roles

Series
 Wild Strawberry - Takeshi

References

External links
  
  
 
 
 
 Tomokazu Seki at GamePlaza-Haruka Voice Acting Database 
 Tomokazu Seki at Hitoshi Doi's Seiyuu Database
 
 

1972 births
Living people
Japanese male video game actors
Japanese male voice actors
Male voice actors from Tokyo
People from Kōtō
Tokyo Actor's Consumer's Cooperative Society voice actors
20th-century Japanese male actors
21st-century Japanese male actors